Bothroponera is a genus of ants in the subfamily Ponerinae. It is distributed in Africa and Asia.

Species

Bothroponera cambouei Forel, 1891
Bothroponera cariosa Emery, 1895
Bothroponera cavernosa (Roger, 1860)
Bothroponera comorensis (André, 1887)
Bothroponera crassa (Emery, 1877)
Bothroponera cribrata (Santschi, 1910)
Bothroponera fugax (Forel, 1907)
Bothroponera glabripes Emery, 1893
Bothroponera granosa (Roger, 1860)
Bothroponera henryi (Donisthorpe, 1942)
Bothroponera kenyensis Santschi, 1937
Bothroponera kruegeri (Forel, 1910)
Bothroponera laevissima (Arnold, 1915)
Bothroponera lamottei Bernard, 1953
Bothroponera masoala (Rakotonirina & Fisher, 2013)
Bothroponera mlanjiensis Arnold, 1946
Bothroponera pachyderma (Emery, 1901)
Bothroponera perroti Forel, 1891
Bothroponera picardi (Forel, 1901)
Bothroponera planicornis (Rakotonirina & Fisher, 2013)
Bothroponera pumicosa (Roger, 1860)
Bothroponera rubescens Santschi, 1937
Bothroponera rubiginosa (Emery, 1889)
Bothroponera sanguinea (Santschi, 1920)
Bothroponera silvestrii (Santschi, 1914)
Bothroponera soror (Emery, 1899)
Bothroponera strigulosa Emery, 1895
Bothroponera sulcata (Mayr, 1867)
Bothroponera talpa André, 1890
Bothroponera tavaratra (Rakotonirina & Fisher, 2013)
Bothroponera tesseronoda (Emery, 1877)
Bothroponera umgodikulula Joma and Mackay, 2013
Bothroponera variolosa Arnold, 1947
Bothroponera vazimba (Rakotonirina & Fisher, 2013)
Bothroponera wasmannii Forel, 1887
Bothroponera williamsi Wheeler, W.M. & Chapman, 1925
Bothroponera zumpti Santschi, 1937

References

Ponerinae
Ant genera
Hymenoptera of Africa
Hymenoptera of Asia